Juan Negri (5 January 1925 – 20 October 2015) was a Chilean footballer. He played in three matches for the Chile national football team in 1950. He was also part of Chile's squad for the 1949 South American Championship.

References

External links
 
 

1925 births
2015 deaths
Chilean footballers
Chile international footballers
Place of birth missing
Association football defenders
Universidad de Chile footballers